The 2009 Kyrgyzstan League (Kyrgyz: Vysshaja Liga) was the 18th season of the top-level football league of Kyrgyzstan. It began in May 2009 with the first match of the regular season and finished in November 2009 with a championship decision match between Abdish-Ata Kant and Dordoi-Dynamo Naryn.

Team overview

 Alay Osh
 Kambar-Ata
 Abdish-Ata Kant
 Dordoi-Dynamo
 Sher Bishkek
 Kant-77
 Dordoi-Plaza (Bishkek)
 Ata Spor (Kant)
 Zhashtyk Ak Altyn Karasuu

Regular season
Each team played against every other team once at home and once away for a total of sixteen matches. The best four teams advanced to the Championship Pool.

League table

Results table

Championship Pool

League table

Results table

Decision match
Since Abdish-Ata and Dordoi-Dynamo finished the Championship Pool with an equal number of points, a decision match will determine the 2009 league champions.

Match

References

Kyrgyzstan League seasons
1
Kyrgyzstan
Kyrgyzstan